Galina Mikhailovna Mitrokhina (née Samorodova, then Konstantinova; ; born 14 February 1940) is a retired Russian rower. She won bronze in the single sculls at the 1962 European Rowing Championships in East Berlin. Between 1963 and 1967 she won five more European titles in single and quad sculls. She also won six national titles in single (1962–1966) and quad sculls (1967). After retirement she worked as a coach.

References

1940 births
Living people
Russian female rowers
Soviet female rowers
European Rowing Championships medalists